Guilty is the twenty-second studio album by American singer Barbra Streisand released on September 23, 1980, by Columbia Records. It was produced by Barry Gibb of the Bee Gees and his group's regular production team of Albhy Galuten and Karl Richardson.

Streisand released a sequel to this album, Guilty Pleasures, in 2005, also produced and largely written by Gibb. Both albums can also be considered partial-collaboration albums, since Streisand not only performed two duets with Gibb, but Gibb could also be heard as a background vocalist in a few other songs solely by the artist herself, along with the fact that both singers were on the cover for both albums issued. The album sold over 12 million copies worldwide.

Background and production
After the huge success of the Bee Gees in the late 1970s, Gibb began to focus on writing and producing songs. Streisand approached Gibb to write songs for her new album—initially he was going to write or co-write only half the album, but the process went so well he ended up doing the entire album. All the songs were written expressly for Streisand except "The Love Inside", which Gibb wrote over a year before.

Two songs ("Secrets" and "Carried Away") were written for the album but not used. Both appear on The Guilty Demos, which features Gibb singing the songs he wrote for Streisand. The outtake songs would later be recorded and released by Elaine Paige and Olivia Newton-John respectively.

Singles
The lead single "Woman in Love" became one of the most successful songs of Streisand's music career and spent a total of three weeks at number one on the Billboard Hot 100 chart. Two other singles were released, which also peaked within the top ten on Billboard Hot 100: the title track, a duet between Streisand and Gibb, won the Grammy Award for Best Pop Performance by a Duo or Group with Vocal in 1981, released as a second single for the album, and became an instant hit, peaking at number three, and "What Kind of Fool", another duet with Gibb, reached number ten for three weeks. The fourth single, "Promises", a more disco-oriented track released in May 1981, reached as high as number 48 in both the U.S. and Canada. It was a much bigger Adult Contemporary hit in both nations, reaching number eight and number five, respectively. This song was also released on Streisand's first commercially released 12" single as a solo artist following her 1979 duet with Donna Summer, "No More Tears (Enough Is Enough)", and two promotional singles released for "Shake Me, Wake Me (When It's Over)" in 1975, and "The Main Event/Fight" in 1979.

Critical reception

The album received favorable reviews from music critics. William Ruhlmann from AllMusic gave the album four and a half stars out of five and wrote that the album is one of the singer's "least characteristic" album and that "it sounds like a post-Saturday Night Fever Bee Gees album with vocals by Streisand." Robert Christgau gave the album a C+ and criticized Streisand's vocals ("most of the time she oversings") and that "when she dramatizes a soap like "Life Story," the mismatch is ridiculous". Stephen Holden from Rolling Stone gave the album a favorable review and wrote that "while Guilty is a romantic entertainment with no ambitions beyond making billions of hearts flutter and earning millions of dollars, it's also as beautifully crafted a piece of ear candy as I've heard in years". He also wrote that "Barbra Streisand and Barry Gibb's album may not be particularly nutritious, but it sure is tasty."

Commercial performance
Guilty became Streisand's best-selling album to date internationally, with sales of 12 million copies worldwide as well as spawning several hit singles. According to the liner notes of Barbra's  retrospective box set: Just for the Record, the album also received a record certification in Austria, Brazil, Denmark, Israel, Japan, the Netherlands, Portugal, Spain. Sweden, Switzerland, and Russia.

Re-release
Guilty was re-released on DualDisc on 30 August 2005 by Sony Legacy Recordings in advance of its sequel project, Guilty Pleasures and also commemorated its 25th anniversary. The re-release featured remastered audio, new interviews with Streisand and Gibb, two live performances from 1986 and a photo gallery of the original photo session for Guilty by Mario Casilli.

Track listing

Credits

Personnel
 Barbra Streisand – lead vocals
 George Bitzer – grand piano (1, 4, 6, 7), electric piano (1), synthesizers (5, 7, 8)
 Richard Tee – electric piano (1, 2, 3, 5, 6, 8), grand piano (2, 9), clavinet (8)
 Albhy Galuten – synthesizers (4-7), horn and string arrangements 
 Barry Gibb – acoustic guitar (1, 2, 3, 6, 7), backing vocals (1, 3, 4, 6, 7), lead vocals (1, 6), horn and string arrangements 
 Cornell Dupree – guitar (1, 8, 9)
 George Terry – guitar (1, 5, 8, 9), slide guitar (3), gut-string guitar (9)
 Pete Carr – guitar (2, 6, 9), acoustic guitar (6)
 Lee Ritenour – guitar (4, 7)
 Harold Cowart – bass guitar (1-4, 6, 8, 9)
 David Hungate – bass guitar (7)
 Steve Gadd – drums (1-4, 6, 8, 9)
 Bernard Lupe – drums (2, 6, 7)
 Dennis Bryon – drums (7)
 Joe Lala – percussion (1, 2, 4, 7, 9)
 Jerry Peel – French horn (2, 3)
 Whit Sidener – baritone saxophone (4, 9)
 Dan Bonsanti – tenor saxophone (4, 9)
 Neal Bonsanti – tenor saxophone (4, 9)
 Peter Graves – trombone (4, 6, 7, 9), horn arrangements 
 Russ Freeland – trombone (6, 7)
 Mike Katz – trombone (6, 7)
 Ken Faulk – trumpet (4, 6, 7, 9)
 Brett Murphy – trumpet (4, 6, 7, 9)
 Gene Orloff – string contractor
 Myrna Matthews – backing vocals (2, 5)
 Denise Maynelli – backing vocals (2, 5)
 Marti McCall – backing vocals (2, 5)

Production
Charles Koppelman – executive producer
 Barry Gibb – producer 
 Albhy Galuten – producer
 Karl Richardson – producer, engineer, mixing
 Don Gehman – engineer, mixing
 Carl Beatty – assistant engineer
 Michael Guerra – assistant engineer
 Dennis Hertzendorfer – assistant engineer
 Dale Peterson – assistant engineer
 Sam Taylor – assistant engineer
 Robert Shames – assistant engineer
 Patrick Von Wiegandt – assistant engineer
 Bob Carbone – mastering at A&M Mastering Studios (Hollywood, California).
 Linda Garrity – production coordinator 
 Nan Leone – studio coordinator
 Tony Lane – visual coordinator
 Mario Casilli – photography

Accolades

American Music Awards

Grammy Awards

National Association of Recording Merchandisers (NARM)

Charts

Weekly charts

Year-end charts

Certifications and sales

References in popular culture
In October 2010, American DJ duo Duck Sauce released a single titled "Barbra Streisand", the cover of which is modeled directly after Guilty. Neither the song nor the artist are associated in any way with Barbra Streisand.

The Guilty Demos
The Guilty Demos is a demo version of the album by Barry Gibb. Not intended for release tapes of these had been circulating among fans before bootleg CDs started emerging. In October 2006 Gibb made these available through iTunes. Recorded in 1979 all of the songs were written that same year except "The Love Inside" which was written in 1978 during work on Spirits Having Flown. All songs feature Barry Gibb's falsetto voice, except "What Kind of Fool" where he used his natural voice. The songs "Carried Away" and "Secrets" were not used by Streisand but instead recorded by Elaine Paige with only "Secrets" being issued on her 1981 self-titled album. Olivia Newton-John recorded and released "Carried Away" on her Physical album, also in 1981. The demo version of "Never Give Up" remains unreleased.

Track listing

Personnel
Barry Gibb - vocals, guitar
Albhy Galuten - synthesizer, drum machine
Blue Weaver - keyboard

See also
 List of best-selling albums by women

References

External links
The Barbra Streisand Music Guide – Guilty
Barbra Archives "Guilty" page with quotes, vintage clippings, CD repackaging notes, and album photo outtakes.
Gibb Songs: Guilty (1980)

Album infoboxes lacking a cover
Barbra Streisand albums
1980 albums
Columbia Records albums
Albums arranged by Barry Gibb
Albums produced by Barry Gibb
Soft rock albums by American artists